The Captayannis was a Greek sugar-carrying vessel that sank in the Firth of Clyde, Scotland in 1974.

Shipwreck
On the evening of 27 January 1974, a severe storm caused the  Captayannis to drag her anchor while she was waiting at the Tail of the Bank to deliver sugar to the James Watt Dock in Greenock. Her captain ordered the engines to be started with the intention of running for the more sheltered waters of the Gareloch but before she could be brought to power she drifted onto the taut anchor chains of the BP tanker British Light. The tanker suffered no damage but her anchor chains holed the sugar boat below the waterline, allowing water to pour in.

Captayannis'''s  Captain Theodorakis Ionnis, realizing that water was flowing in so fast that she was in imminent danger of sinking, opted to beach her in the shallow waters over the sandbank and steered to the desired spot where she stuck fast. The pilot boats, the tug Labrador and Clyde Marine Motoring's 20 metre passenger vessel Rover came to assist. The vessel heeled over so far that it was possible for the crew to jump onto the deck of the Rover. 25 of the crew were taken ashore aboard the Rover, but the Captain and four crewmen waited on the Labrador, standing off the stricken vessel. The ship finally succumbed the next morning, rolling onto her side. She has lain there ever since.

Most, if not all of her more valuable metals and fittings have been removed by looters, leaving just her steel hull and superstructure, though some of her wooden decking remains in remarkably good condition after more than 40 years in the sea. Her hull remains sound, though her thinner deck plates are starting to rust through with holes opening up in places.

Today
Through time Captayannis'' has become 'home' to marine life and birds. She has never been removed as confusion surrounds the identity of her owners and insurers – no one accepts responsibility for her removal. She is known to many locals simply as the "sugar boat".

The wreck is a familiar sight near the Tail of the Bank and can be seen on satellite images.  The wreck is not to be confused with that of the French warship Maillé Brézé which sank nearby in 1940, but was later removed and cut up in Port Glasgow in 1956.

Wreck

 Area: Sand bank between Greenock and Helensburgh
 Location: Firth of Clyde Scotland UK
 Position: 
 Max. Depth: 9.00
 Year Sank: 1974
 How Sank: Hit anchor chain of another ship.
 Condition: Substantially intact

Notes

External links

Shipwrecks in rivers
1946 ships
Shipwrecks in the Firth of Clyde
1974 in Scotland
Ships built in Denmark
Merchant ships of Greece